Illoana Smith (born 13 May 1957) is a Canadian rowing cox. She competed in the women's eight event at the 1976 Summer Olympics.

References

1957 births
Living people
Canadian female rowers
Olympic rowers of Canada
Rowers at the 1976 Summer Olympics
Sportspeople from Weyburn
Coxswains (rowing)